Awaji Kannon or World Peace Giant Kannon, a museum and a temple in Awaji Island, Hyogo Prefecture, Japan. The structure is currently abandoned.

Description
Construction of Awaji Kannon started in 1977 Toyokichi Okuuchi, realtor from the Okuchi group. Okuchi managed the building until his death in 1988, his wife took over and continue to operate but also died in 2006.  

In March 2020 the statue and the surrounding land became property of the Japanese government. The crumbling facilities, in addition to a February 2020 incident in which someone committed suicide by jumping from the observation deck, led to unease among the local population. In April 2020, it was announced that the statue is to be demolished by the end of 2022.

See also 
List of tallest statues

References

Monuments and memorials in Japan
Colossal statues in Japan
Concrete Buddha statues
Buildings and structures in Hyōgo Prefecture